Winners of the Gospel Music Association Dove Award for New Artist of the Year (or Most Promising New Gospel Talent from 1970–73) are the following:
 1970 Four Gallileans
 1971 Awards voided  by GMA voting irregularities Kay Blackwood
 1972 London Paris and the Apostles
 1973 John Matthews Family
 NOTE:  No award was given from 1974 until 1987. Since 1988, the GMA standards include an artist may not produce two new studio albums during the timeframe of the awards.
 1988 BeBe & CeCe Winans
 1989 Take 6
 1990 David Mullen
 1991 4Him
 1992 Michael English
 1993 Cindy Morgan
 1994 Point of Grace
 1995 Clay Crosse
 1996 Jars of Clay
 1997 Jaci Velasquez
 1998 Avalon
 1999 Jennifer Knapp
 2000 Ginny Owens
 2001 Plus One
 2002 ZOEgirl
 2003 Paul Colman Trio
 2004 Jeremy Camp
 2005 Building 429
 2006 The Afters
 2007 Aaron Shust
 2008 Brandon Heath
 2009 Tenth Avenue North
 2010 Sidewalk Prophets
 2011 Chris August
 2012 Jamie Grace
 2013 For King & Country
 2014 Ellie Holcomb
 2015 Lauren Daigle
 2016 Jordan Feliz
 2017 Zach Williams
 2018 Tauren Wells
 2019 Aaron Cole
 2020 We the Kingdom
 2021 Maverick City Music
 2022 Anne Wilson

References

GMA Dove Awards